This is the discography of the Finnish rock band Leningrad Cowboys, which consists of nine studio albums, thirteen singles, four live albums, four extended plays, four compilation albums, and one soundtrack album in addition to a number of miscellaneous appearances on soundtracks and compilations featuring various artists.

The Leningrad cowboys were formed in 1986 by members of the Finnish group Sleepy Sleepers and film director Aki Kaurismäki as a joke on the waning power of the Soviet Union. Kaurismäki's first feature with the group was a success and led to the group developing a life beyond the films, recording albums, giving concerts, and making their own videos.

Albums

Studio albums

Soundtracks

Live albums

Compilations

Singles

EPs

Videography

Feature films

Concert films

Music videos

Bibliography

Contributions and other releases

References

Discographies of Finnish artists
Rock music group discographies